Beware of Widows is a 1927 American comedy film directed by Wesley Ruggles and written by Beatrice Van. It is based on the 1925 play Beware of Widows by Owen Moore. The film stars Laura La Plante, Bryant Washburn, Paulette Duval, Walter Hiers, Tully Marshall and Kathryn Carver. The film was released on May 23, 1927, by Universal Pictures. The survival status of the film is unknown.

Cast          
Laura La Plante as Joyce Bragdon
Bryant Washburn as Dr. John Waller
Paulette Duval as Mrs. Paul Warren
Walter Hiers as William Bradford
Tully Marshall as Peter Chadwick
Kathryn Carver as Ruth Chadwick
Heinie Conklin as Captain
Otto Hoffman as Mr. Warren

References

External links
 

1927 films
1920s English-language films
Silent American comedy films
1927 comedy films
Universal Pictures films
Films directed by Wesley Ruggles
American silent feature films
American black-and-white films
1920s American films